Tafawa Balewa Square Bus Terminus also known as TBS Bus Terminal situated at the center of Lagos Island, Lagos State, South West, Nigeria. The bus terminus is located on 45/57 Massey Bamgbose Street, Lagos Island.

The TBS Bus Terminal is housed by the Tafawa Balew Square built in 1972 to celebrate the independence of Nigeria on 1 October 1960. On 18 March 2016, the administration of Akinwumi Ambode, former governor of Lagos State concluded plans to revitalize the terminus to "further enhance the state's mega-city project". The new terminus was commissioned in 2017.

Routes 

 TBS - CMS 
 TBS - Ikeja, Barracks
 TBS - Ajah, Lekki Routes
 TBS - Oshodi
TBS - Berger
TBS - Leventis
TBS - Fadeyi
TBS - Ikorodu

Reference 

Lagos Metropolitan Area Transport Authority
Lagos Island
Bus stations in Lagos